The Fidelity Magellan Fund is a U.S.-domiciled mutual fund from the Fidelity family of funds. It is perhaps the world's best-known actively managed mutual fund, known particularly for its record-setting growth under the management of Peter Lynch from 1977 to 1990. On January 14, 2008, Fidelity announced that the fund would open to new investors for the first time in over a decade.

By the end of the 20th century the Magellan Fund had well over $100 billion in assets under management. For quite some time it was the single largest mutual fund in the world until April 2000, when it was displaced by Vanguard's S&P 500 index fund.

Overview
Fidelity earns its income, like most companies managing mutual funds, from fees charged on its funds' assets under management (AUM).  From the fund's inception in 1963 through 1977 Magellan grew to $20 million in AUM. The $20 million fund Peter Lynch inherited grew to $14 billion in AUM during his tenure.  During Morris Smith's tenure, AUM grew from $14 billion to $20 billion.  During Jeffrey Vinik's it grew to $50 billion. Bob Stansky certainly experienced the most volatility with respect to AUM during his time with Magellan. In July 1996, his first month as manager, more than $3.5 billion was taken out of the fund as investors redeemed their shares and the portfolio experienced setbacks.  Stansky quickly moved out of bonds and into stocks to stop the assets from flowing out. On September 30, 1997, Fidelity decided to close the Magellan Fund to new investors. They believed that the size of the fund was beginning to make it difficult to beat the market. The largest growth of the fund occurred under Lynch's management with  a growth in assets invested in the fund  from $18 million to $14 billion during his tenure. However, the best annual return was 116.08% in 1965, and the best three year record was 68.32% annualized between 1965 and 1967, as the fund was operating with limited assets and oversight.

Management by Peter Lynch, 1977-1990

Peter Lynch took the reins in May 1977 and remained the manager of Magellan for the next thirteen years.  Between 1977 and 1990 the fund averaged over a 29% annual return, making Magellan the best performing mutual fund in the world. Lynch created the investment process commonly referred to as “Buy What You Know."  Lynch proposed that the person on the street is just as capable of identifying good stocks as a Wall Street professional, and noted that many of his best stock picks came from his experiences with a company as a customer, rather than through usual trade publication or analyst reports. Many good tips came from his wife, who did most of the household shopping and occasionally noticed customer trends before professionals did, a phenomenon he called "street lag". Lynch bucked many prevailing trends on mutual fund investing, such as buying many more stocks than usual. Magellan had about 60 stocks when Lynch took over, and he was advised to trim that number to 25-30. He instead bought hundreds of stocks he believed were bargains, including the then-unusual step of owning multiple stocks from the same industry (e.g., dozens of savings and loan association or convenience stores). In 1989, Magellan held an unheard-of 1,400 stocks.

In 1989, just before relinquishing the management of the Magellan fund,  he published his best-seller  "One Up on Wall Street", published by Simon & Schuster. The book provides an insight into his investing approach. He popularized the idea of "Growth at a reasonable price" (GARP). He used the ratio PEG (PE ratio divided by per share growth rate) as a metric. He regarded PEG ratio of 1.0 or lower to be an indicator of inherent value. He preferred stocks with sustainable growth. He examined the attributes of potential  "ten-baggers" and "four-bagers".

Magellan fund was not open to public until mid 1981. Only the Johnson family was able to invest in it.

Peter Lynch retired at 46 but continued to stay on at Fidelity as a senior advisor. He is independently wealthy with a net worth of $352 million in 2006.

Morris Smith and Jeff Vinik, 1990-1996 
Morris Smith, who had successfully run Fidelity's Select Leisure Fund and Fidelity Over-the-Counter Fund, replaced Lynch as the manager of Magellan.  During the two years he was there he managed to beat the S&P 500 by 7%.  An orthodox Jew, he decided to leave investing entirely after his experience at Magellan and has spent time pursuing religious activities and moved to Israel.

Jeffrey Vinik spent four years managing Magellan and during that time he produced an 83.70% cumulative return and outperformed the cumulative S&P500 return by 5.91%.  Vinik is most often remembered as the manager who moved a high percentage of the portfolio out of technology stocks and into bonds at the wrong time, causing Magellan to underperform its peers for the first time in the fund's history.  However, others argue that Vinik merely moved into bonds early.  Vinik moved Magellan into bonds in the fall of 1995.  In the seven years ending in March 2003, on a total return basis, 10-year Treasuries returned 78 percent, AAA corporate bonds returned 46 percent, and, with dividends reinvested, the S&P 500 returned 31 percent.  In addition, Vinik's strategy would have avoided the dot-com bust.

After leaving Fidelity, Vinik started a successful hedge fund, Vinik Asset Management, during 1996-2013.

Robert Stansky 1996-2005, underperformance

Robert "Bob" Stansky is a direct disciple of Lynch's having worked as his research assistant from 1984 to 1987. He had previously run Fidelity Growth Company. During his time at Magellan Stansky managed to return 238% for the fund.  However, the S&P 500 index returned 274% during the same period.  This marked the only regime where Magellan underperformed the market.  Magellan's portfolio closely resembled the S&P 500 during Stansky's tenure—so much so that Stansky himself helped coin the phrase "closet indexer".

Harry Lange 2005-2011, drop in assets

By the time Stansky retired in 2005, the assets under management for Magellan were back down to $52.5 billion.  Harry W. Lange took over Magellan and promptly changed the portfolio to reflect his view on the market. Lange represented a change for the Magellan fund.  His approach was known as a 'go everywhere approach'. This means he was just as likely to buy small cap stocks as he was large cap stocks, value as he was growth, US companies as he was international. Today about 25 percent of Magellan is invested in companies based outside the United States. In May 2006, Magellan made a capital gains distribution to shareholders of $22.11 representing roughly 18% of assets.  As of 12/31/08 the total AUM for the Magellan Fund stands at $19 billion. Lange has said that he believes Magellan can handle more assets. After being closed for over a decade, on January 14, 2008, Fidelity announced that the fund would be re-opened to new investors. Harry Lange presided over the largest drop in assets under management, as a percentage, as well as in absolute dollars, of Magellan.

Jeffrey S. Feingold 2011-

On September 13, 2011, Fidelity named Jeffrey S. Feingold, manager of Fidelity Trend Fund, as the next manager of Fidelity Magellan Fund.

On February 4, 2021, Fidelity launched an ETF version of the Magellan fund that trades under the ticker, FMAG.  The Magellan ETF is managed by Tim Gannon and Sammy Simnegar.

Financial performance

References

External links
 Official website

Mutual funds of the United States
Stock funds